Malesso'  (formerly Merizo) is the southernmost village in the United States territory of Guam. Cocos Island (Chamorro: Islan Dåno) is a part of the municipality. The village's population has decreased since the island's 2010 census.

Malesso' is the closest populated place in the United States to the equator.

History 

During the first Spanish missionary efforts on Guam, Malesso' was the site of resistance encouraged by Choco, a Chinese resident of the village.  The parish of Malesso' was the second established by the Spanish on Guam. A large population of Chamorros from the Mariana Islands were relocated to the village during Spanish rule.

Places of interest for visitors include Merizo Bell Tower, Malesso' Kombento and Merizo Pier where ferries can be taken to Cocos Island (Guam) Resort. Several popular dive sites are located off the Malesso' coast.

In August 2021, Gov. Lou Leon Guerrero signed a bill officially changing the name of the village from Merizo to Malesso'.

Contamination of lagoon 
Officials from the Guam Environmental Protection Agency, Department of Public Health and Social Services and the Coast Guard announced findings of major polychlorinated biphenyl (PCB) contamination in the  Cocos Lagoon on February 20, 2006 and warned people not to eat fish caught there. The contamination is believed to have come from a United States Coast Guard station which operated on Cocos Island from 1944-1963.

Climate

Demographics
The U.S. Census Bureau has the Malesso' census-designated place.

Education

Primary and secondary schools

Public schools
Guam Public School System serves the island.

Merizo Martyrs Elementary School in Malesso' and Inarajan Middle School in Inarajan serve Malesso'.

Southern High School in Santa Rita serves the village.

Public libraries
Guam Public Library System operates the Malesso' Library at 376 Cruz Avenue.

Recreation

Water sport crafts can be rented near Merizo Pier. The pier is also a fishing spot.

List of mayors

See also 

Villages of Guam

References 

 Rogers, Robert F (1995). Destiny's Landfall: A History of Guam: University of Hawai'i Press. 
 Carter, Lee D; Carter, Rosa Roberto; Wuerch, William L (1997). Guam History: Perspectives Volume One: MARC. 
 Sanchez, Pedro C. Guahan, Guam: The History of our Island: Sanchez Publishing House.

External links 
 Merizo Guam at Guam Portal

Villages in Guam
Census-designated places in Guam